Kappa Normae, Latinized from κ Normae, is a solitary, yellow hued star in the southern constellation of Norma. Its apparent magnitude is 4.94, which is bright enough to be faintly visible to the naked eye. It is drifting closer with a radial velocity of 13.5 km/s.

This is an evolved giant star with a stellar classification of G8III that has swollen and cooled off the main sequence. At present it has 22 times the radius of the Sun. It shines with a luminosity approximately 226 times that of the Sun and has an effective temperature of 4,787 K.

References

G-type giants
Norma (constellation)
Normae, Kappa
Durchmusterung objects
145397
079509
6024